Olivier Peslier (born 12 January 1973 in Château-Gontier) is a French thoroughbred horse racing jockey.

Peslier competes in flat racing mainly in France but travels often around the world for the big international races. He was a retained jockey for Wertheimer et Frère from 2003 to 2014. In his free time, Peslier plays paintball, an unusual hobby for a jockey.

Career wins in France
* = Champion Jockey
 1991 – 46
 1992 – 31
 1993 – 91
 1994 – 116
 1995 – 132
 1996 – 163 *
 1997 – 157 *
 1998 – 142
 1999 – 147 *
 2000 – 162 *
 2001 – 148
 2002 – 98
 2003 – 109
 2004 – 123
 2005 – 99
 2006 – 107
 2007 – 94
 2008 – 87
 2009 – 92
 2010 – 105
 2011 – 91 
 2012 - 90

Major wins
 France
 Critérium de Saint-Cloud – (1) – Sagacity (2000)
 Grand Prix de Paris – (2) – Peintre Celebre (1997), Limpid (1998)
 Grand Prix de Saint-Cloud – (3) – Helissio (1996), Fragrant Mix (1998), Plumania (2010)
 Poule d'Essai des Poulains – (2) – Falco (2008), Make Believe (2015)
 Poule d'Essai des Pouliches – (4) – Torrestrella (2004), Golden Lilac (2011), Precieuse (2017), Teppal (2018)
 Prix de l'Arc de Triomphe – (4) – Helissio (1996), Peintre Celebre (1997), Sagamix (1998), Solemia (2012)
 Prix du Cadran – (2) – Molesnes (1994), Westerner (2004)
 Prix de la Forêt – (5) – Bigstone (1994), Poplar Bluff (1995), Etoile Montante (2003), Goldikova (2010), Make Believe (2015)
 Prix Ganay – (5) – Helissio (1997), Indian Danehill (2000), Fair Mix (2003), Cirrus des Aigles (2012), Pastorius (2013)
 Prix d'Ispahan – (6) – Bigstone (1994), Loup Sauvage (1998), Sageburg (2008), Goldikova (2010, 2011), Recoletos (2018) 
 Prix Jacques Le Marois – (3) – Vahorimix (2001), Banks Hill (2002), Goldikova (2009)
 Prix Jean-Luc Lagardère – (2) – Lost World (1993), Loup Solitaire (1995)
 Prix Jean Prat – (5) – Le Balafre (1993), Turtle Bowl (2005), Lawman (2007), Charm Spirit (2014), Laws of Indices (2021)
 Prix du Jockey Club – (2) – Peintre Celebre (1997), Intello (2013)
 Prix Lupin – (2) – Cloudings (1997), Gracioso (1999)
 Prix Marcel Boussac – (3) – Miss Tahiti (1995), Lady of Chad (1999), Silasol (2012)
 Prix du Moulin de Longchamp – (3) – Desert Prince (1998), Goldikova (2008), Recoletos (2018)
 Prix de l'Opéra – (1) – Verveine (1993), Villa Marina (2019)
 Prix Rothschild – (6) – Shaanxi (1996), Goldikova (2008, 2009, 2010, 2011), Amazing Maria (2015)
 Prix Royal-Oak – (3) – Amilynx (1999, 2000), Montare (2006)
 Prix Saint-Alary – (4) – Muncie (1995), Brilliance (1997), Fidelite (2003), Silasol (2013)
 Prix de la Salamandre – (1) – Xaar (1997)
 Prix Vermeille – (3) – Queen Maud (1997), Galikova (2011), Teona (2021)

 Canada
 E.P. Taylor Stakes – (1) – Kool Kat Katie (1997)

 Germany
 Deutsches Derby – (2) – Borgia (1997), Dai Jin (2003)
 Preis von Europa - (1) - Scalo (2010)
 Rheinland-Pokal – (1) – Dai Jin (2003)
 Grosser Preis von Berlin - (1) - French King (2019)

 Turkey
Malazgirt Trophy
Ifhar Trophy

 Great Britain
 2,000 Guineas – (1) – Cockney Rebel (2007)
 Ascot Gold Cup – (1) – Westerner (2005)
 Coronation Stakes – (2) – Shake the Yoke (1996), Banks Hill (2001)
 Derby – (1) – High-Rise (1998)
 Dewhurst Stakes – (1) – Xaar (1997)
 Falmouth Stakes – (1) – Goldikova (2009)
 King George VI and Queen Elizabeth Stakes – (1) – Harbinger (2010)
 King's Stand Stakes – (2) – Don't Worry Me (1997), Equiano (2008)
 Lockinge Stakes – (1) – Keltos (2002)
 Prince of Wales's Stakes – (2) – Ouija Board (2006), Vision d'Etat (2009)
 Queen Anne Stakes – (1) – Goldikova (2010)
 Queen Elizabeth II Stakes – (3) – Air Express (1997), Desert Prince (1998), Charm Spirit (2014)
 Hardwicke Stakes -(1) - "Dartmouth "(2016)

 Spain 
Premio Copa
Premio Duc De Toledo Memorial

 Sharjah
Rayyan Cup

 Hong Kong
 Hong Kong Cup – (1) – Vision d'Etat (2009)
 Hong Kong Mile – (2) – Docksider (1999), Hat Trick (2005)
 Hong Kong Vase – (4) – Partipral (1995), Borgia (1999), Doctor Dino (2007, 2008)

 United States
 Breeders' Cup Filly & Mare Turf – (1) – Banks Hill (2001)
 Breeders' Cup Mile – (3) – Goldikova (2008, 2009, 2010)
 Man o' War Stakes – (1) – Doctor Dino (2007)

 Abu Dhabi 
The President Of The UAE Cup

 Saudi Arabia 
 King's Cup
Custodian of the Holy Two Mosques
 Crown Prince Cup
King Abdulaziz Cup

 Mauritius
The Air Mauritius Pailles
Le Grand Prix De France
The Long Beach Cup

 Ireland
 Irish 2,000 Guineas – (3) – Desert Prince (1998), Saffron Walden (1999), Cockney Rebel (2007)
 Irish Derby – (1) – Winged Love (1995)
 Irish St Leger – (1) – Sans Frontières (2010)

 Italy
 Gran Criterium – (2) – Glory of Dancer (1995), Hearts of Fire (2009)

 Japan
 Arima Kinen – (3) – Symboli Kris S (2002, 2003), Zenno Rob Roy (2004)
 February Stakes - (2) - Wing Arrow (2000), Nobo True (2001)
 Hanshin Juvenile Fillies - (1) - Tamuro Cherry (2001)
 Japan Cup – (2) – Jungle Pocket (2001), Zenno Rob Roy (2004)
 Mile Championship – (2) – Zenno El Cid (2001), Hat Trick (2005)
 Tenno Sho (Autumn) – (2) – Symboli Kris S (2003), Zenno Rob Roy (2004)

 Switzerland
Swiss Derby

 United Arab Emirates
 Dubai Kahayla Classic - (2) - Magic De Piboule (2001), Seraphin Du Paon (2011)
 Dubai Sheema Classic - (1) - Cirrus des Aigles (2012)
 Godolphin Mile - (1) - Tereshkova (1996)
Al Maktoum Round Challenge III
Al Maktoum Round Challenge Arab III

 Dubai
Jebel Ali Sprint
Jebel Ali Mile

 Qatar
H H The Emir Trophy 
H H The Emir sword
The Heir Apparent Trophy
The Heir Apparent Sword
Qatar International Derby 
Qatar International Cup
Qatar International Trophy
Khor Al alaide Cup

Year-end charts

References 

1973 births
Living people
People from Château-Gontier
French jockeys
Sportspeople from Mayenne